The Dovecot At Blackford Farm in Selworthy on Exmoor within the English county of Somerset was probably built in the 11th century. It is a Grade II* listed building, and scheduled monument.

The cylindrical stone dovecote has a cone shaped roof. It contains over 300 nest boxes. The pigeons would have been domesticated for food, possibly by Montacute Priory or by the local lord of the manor. It is now owned by the National Trust and used as a store for the neighbouring farm.

History
The earliest written record of the dovecote was in 1393 although the exact date of construction is not known. It was attached to a mansion house which burnt down in 1875. The manor previously belonged to Montacute Priory, a Cluniac priory of the Benedictine order, founded between 1078 and 1102 although it is not known if the construction of the dovecote was undertaken by the priory or the Lovel family who later held the manor. Pigeons and doves were an important food source historically kept for their eggs, flesh (squab), and dung.

The dovecote which forms part of the property of the Holnicote Estate, was donated to the National Trust by Sir Richard Thomas Dyke Acland, 15th Baronet in 1944. It was scheduled as an ancient monument in 1949 and designated as a Grade II* listed building in 1969. Repairs were undertaken to the dovecote in 1993. The building is used as a store by the neighbouring farmer.

Architecture

It contains over 300 nest holes. These are arranged into 11 tiers with an irregular pattern.

The original hole in the roof for the entry of the pigeons was covered by a flat stone and is now covered with glass to keep the interior dry. The interior of the roof has putlog holes rather than nesting boxes but may also have been used by pigeons.

References

Grade II* listed buildings in West Somerset
Scheduled monuments in West Somerset
Dovecotes
Exmoor